, also known by the name THE SxPLAY, is a Japanese singer. She debuted as a musician in 2009, and sung "Kimi ga Iru Kara," the theme song for the Japanese version of Final Fantasy XIII.

Biography 
In January 2008, Sayuri Sugawara participated in the "7 Days Audition" and the "30 Days Audition". She won both auditions and received a contract with For Life Music Entertainment

Following the digital success of her debut song, Sugawara released her debut single, "Ano Hi no Yakusoku" on September 30, 2009. On September 3, 2009, at the Final Fantasy XIII premiere, it was announced that she would perform its theme song, "Kimi ga Iru Kara". Composed by Masashi Hamauzu, Sugawara performed the song with a live orchestral accompaniment at the premiere. A single for Kimi ga Iru Kara was released on December 2, two weeks before the release date of Final Fantasy XIII.

Her first album, First Story, was released on January 27, 2010. And peaked at number 14 on the Oricon charts, selling 10,217 copies. Sugawara's third single, "Sunao ni Narenakute", released May 19, 2010 was used as the insert song for the drama of the same title, Sunao ni Narenakute, starring Eita and Juri Ueno. Also on September 1, 2010, Sugawara's fourth single, "Suki to Iu Kotoba", was used as the theme song to the 2010 version of the drama Kasoken no Onna. On October 16 and 24, Sugawara held her first live tour at Shinsaibashi and Shibuya Club Quattro titled "Sugawara Sayuri Live Tour - The One". And also held school festival live tours in November at Toho, Kitasato and Momoyama Universities.

Sugawara released her second album, Open the Gate, on November 14, 2010.

On February 2, 2014, Sugawara revealed that she had cut ties with For Life Music and was now performing as an indie singer. On March 30, 2014, she revealed her new stage name, THE SxPLAY. She released her first independent extended play Call to Action on May 28, 2014.

In September 2016, the track "Mikansei-Canvas", off of her EP "Butterfly Effect", was chosen to be the theme song for the 2016-17 edition of the Paralym Art World Cup. Her track "Boku wa Robot Goshi no Kimi ni Koi wo Suru", was used as the theme song for the anime of the same name.

She married an unnamed individual on December 10, 2020.

Her songs, "Kimi ga Nokoshita Sekai de", "Guardian", "Haname", and "Lycoris" are all featured in the game Deemo.

Discography

Albums

Extended plays

Singles

Digital downloads

Collaborations/compilations

References

External links 
  

Living people
1990 births
People from Yokote, Akita
Video game musicians
Japanese women pop singers
Musicians from Akita Prefecture
21st-century Japanese singers
21st-century Japanese women singers